The pale-bellied mourner (Rhytipterna immunda) is a species of bird in the family Tyrannidae.

It is found in Brazil, Colombia, French Guiana, Suriname, and Venezuela. Its natural habitat is subtropical or tropical dry shrubland.

References

pale-bellied mourner
Birds of the Amazon Basin
Birds of the Guianas
pale-bellied mourner
pale-bellied mourner
pale-bellied mourner
Taxonomy articles created by Polbot